Palm Garden or Palm Gardens may refer to:

 Palm Garden station, a light rail station in Pittsburgh, Pennsylvania, United States
 Palm Gardens, Nevada, United States, an unincorporated community
 Palm Garden, a restaurant at Lakefront Brewery in Milwaukee, Wisconsin, United States

See also
 Garden of Palms, a palm tree landscape garden in Paramaribo, Suriname